Canadian Regional Airlines was a regional airline headquartered in Calgary International Airport in Calgary, Alberta, Canada. It is now part of Air Canada Jazz.

Former code data 
IATA code: KI
ICAO code: CDR
Callsign: Canadian Regional

History

Historical fleet
Time Air operated Fokker F28 Fellowship twin jets (see photo) as Canadian Regional flights.  At one point, Time Air was the largest F28 operator in the world.

Canadian Regional operated 7 ATR 42-300s turboprops between 1993 and 1998 when they were transferred to Inter-Canadien. Those ATR42 came from Ontario Express who first operated them in 1988. This was the first airline to import and operate them in Canada. Ontario Express was also the first airline to import in Canada the Jetstream 31 in 1987, when the company first started its operations in Ontario. Both the Jetstream 31 and the ATR42 proved to be very successful aircraft in the regional airline environment.

Canadian Regional also operated 13 de Havilland Canada DHC-8-100 Dash 8 and 15 stretched de Havilland Canada DHC-8-300 Dash 8 turboprops from 1994 until the consolidation. Many still operate as Air Canada Jazz planes.

Accidents and incidents
On February 5, 2001 a passenger was severely burned after sulphuric acid leaked from carry-on baggage in an overhead rack on a Canadian Regional Fokker F28 with ten passengers. A second passenger suffered lesser burns after the acid struck both their faces. Six people received medical attention for inhaling fumes after an emergency landing at Vancouver Airport.

See also 
 List of defunct airlines of Canada

References

External links

Air Canada Jazz

Air Canada
Defunct airlines of Canada
Former Oneworld affiliate members
Airlines established in 1991
Airlines disestablished in 2002
1991 establishments in Alberta